Volodymyr Ivanov is a Ukrainian biathlete, cross-country skier, sighted guide, and Paralympian.

He has competed at three Paralympic Games as the sighted guide for Vitaliy Lukyanenko.

Career
At the 2002 Winter Paralympics he competed in cross-country skiing and biathlon as the sighted guide for Vitaliy Lukyanenko. In cross-country skiing, they took the bronze medal in the 5 km classical technique, B3. They placed 16th in the 20 km free technique, 4th in the 10 km free technique, B3, and 5th in the men's relay. In biathlon, they placed 11th in the 7.5 km free technique, blind.

He competed as the sighted guide for Lukyanenko in biathlon and cross-country skiing at the 2006 Winter Paralympics. In cross-country skiing he took the bronze in the men's relay with Lukyanenko, Vladyslav Morozov, and Oleh Munts. He placed 7th in the men's 5 km, visually impaired. In biathlon, he took the gold medal in 12.5 km, and silver in 7.5 km, blind.

He competed in biathlon and cross-country skiing at the 2010 Winter Paralympics in Vancouver, Canada as the sighted guide for Lukyanenko. In cross-country skiing he won silver in the men's relay, open with Lukyanenko, Grygorii Vovchynskyi, and Iurii Kostiuk. He placed 5th in the men's 1 km sprint, visually impaired. In biathlon, he took the bronze medal in the 12.5 km, and the gold medal in the men's 3 km pursuit, visually impaired.

References

Ukrainian male cross-country skiers
Ukrainian male biathletes
Paralympic sighted guides
Paralympic biathletes of Ukraine
Paralympic cross-country skiers of Ukraine
Biathletes at the 2002 Winter Paralympics
Biathletes at the 2006 Winter Paralympics
Biathletes at the 2010 Winter Paralympics
Cross-country skiers at the 2002 Winter Paralympics
Cross-country skiers at the 2006 Winter Paralympics
Cross-country skiers at the 2010 Winter Paralympics
Paralympic gold medalists for Ukraine
Paralympic silver medalists for Ukraine
Paralympic bronze medalists for Ukraine
Living people
Medalists at the 2002 Winter Paralympics
Medalists at the 2006 Winter Paralympics
Medalists at the 2010 Winter Paralympics
Year of birth missing (living people)
Paralympic medalists in cross-country skiing
Paralympic medalists in biathlon